Jan Walenty Węgierski (1755–1796), of Wieniawa Coat of Arms, was a Deputy Chancellor (podkanclerz) and Chamberlain of last king of Poland, Stanisław August Poniatowski. He was a member of the Great Sejm and supporter of Kościuszko Insurrection.

Owner of Szczyty-Dzięciołowo, Szczyty-Nowodwory and Hrabniak, he sponsored the construction of several Eastern Orthodox Churches in Podlasie Voivodeship.

Son of Andrzej Węgierski and Ewa Niedzwiecka. He had one son, who died as an infant. In 1796 he adopted a son of his nephew, Antoni Wiewiórowski, who inherited all of his possessions.

References

1755 births
1796 deaths
18th-century Polish nobility
Members of the Great Sejm